The 1999 Mid-Continent Conference men's basketball tournament was held February 28-March 2, 1999, at The MARK of the Quad Cities in Moline, Illinois.
This was the 16th edition of the tournament for the Association of Mid-Continent Universities/Mid-Continent Conference, now known as the Summit League.

Second seed  defeated top seed  73–69 to earn an automatic berth into the 1999 NCAA tournament.

Bracket

References 

Summit League men's basketball tournament
1998–99 Mid-Continent Conference men's basketball season
1999 in sports in Illinois